Vaggelis Papachristos (born 1955) is a Greek politician.

During the Greek military junta of 1967–1974 he was arrested for his anti-junta activism as a student and sentenced to six years' imprisonment. He was released after the collapse of the junta's military rule and the re-establishment of democratic institutions in July 1974.

He has been member of the central committee of the Communist Party of Greece. He left CPG and joined Panhellenic Socialist Movement (PASOK) in 1989.

He has been elected to the Greek Parliament for the first time in 2007.

In December 2010 he was outed from PASOK for voting against the proposed law on restructuring labour relations and state owned enterprises.

References

External links

Living people
1955 births
Greek MPs 2007–2009
Greek MPs 2009–2012
Greek prisoners and detainees
People from Preveza